Cedar Point Wind Farm is a 252.3 megawatt (MW) wind farm in eastern Colorado, United States, north of the town of Limon.  It was the second largest wind facility in the state when it was completed in 2011.  The electricity is being sold to Xcel Energy under a 20-year power purchase agreement.

Facility details

The facility is located on about 20,000 acres of leased private land  80 miles east of Denver.  It extends across western Lincoln County and crosses a few miles into Elbert County.  42 miles of new overhead transmission line carry the electricity to the Xcel Energy substation near Deer Trail in Arapahoe County.

Renewable Energy Systems developed and constructed the project.  Numerous turbine components were produced at Vestas' manufacturing facilities in Colorado.  Construction began in August 2010 and completed in September 2011, employing about 365 workers.   The construction included 139 - 1.8 MW Vestas turbines, two substations, one operations and maintenance building, and transmission lines. The facility is owned and operated by Enbridge, employing about 12 permanent workers. It generates enough electricity to meet the needs of about 80,000 Colorado homes.

Electricity production 

(*) partial year of operation

See also

Wind power in the United States
Wind power in Colorado
List of onshore wind farms

References

Energy infrastructure completed in 2011
Wind farms in Colorado
Buildings and structures in Lincoln County, Colorado